|}

The Churchill Stakes is a Listed flat horse race in Great Britain open to horses aged three years or older. It is run over a distance of 1 mile and 2 furlongs (2,012 metres) at Lingfield Park in November.

The race was first run in 2000.

Records
Most successful horse since 2000:
 Compton Bolter (2000, 2001, 2003)

Leading jockey since 2000 (3 wins):
 Sean Levey – Team Talk (2016), Master the World (2017, 2018)

Leading trainer since 2000 (6 wins):
 Gerard Butler – Compton Bolter (2000, 2001, 2003), Beauchamp Pilot (2002), Nayyir (2006), Prince Alzain (2013)

Winners

See also 
 Horse racing in Great Britain
 List of British flat horse races

References 

Racing Post: 

Flat races in Great Britain
Lingfield Park Racecourse
Open middle distance horse races
2000 establishments in England
Recurring sporting events established in 2000